Crucificados pelo Sistema is the first album Ratos de Porão, which was released in 1984 through Punk Rock Discos. In July 2016, it was elected by Rolling Stone Brasil as the best Brazilian punk rock album.

Track listing

Personnel
 João "Gordo" Francisco Benedan - vocals
 Rinaldo "Mingau" Amaral - guitar
 Jarbas "Jabá" Alves - bass
 João "Jão" Carlos Molina Esteves - drums

References 

1984 albums
Ratos de Porão albums